My Mine is an Italo disco group formed in Terni, Italy in 1983.

Their debut album Stone was produced by Mauro Malavasi and recorded at Fonoprint Studios in Bologna, Italy. My Mine's first single, "Hypnotic Tango", became an international hit across Europe. After the release of their first single, the band recorded their second single titled "Zorro". Wanting to pursue a more innovative sound for "Zorro", the band spent roughly a month working on it. However the trio made the mistake of leaving behind the sound that made "Hypnotic Tango" popular turning "Zorro" into a commercial failure.

After the failure of their second single, the band suffered through a tumultuous period. The band was advised by their production team to choose an English singer over Stefano Micheli. Arriving from London, Darren Hatch took the reign as the main vocalist in 1985. With a new vocalist, My Mine began work on their first album, Stone. The band's intention focused on recovering the popularity and fame from their first single. Their last attempt at this was with "Can Delight", which the production deemed worthy play since it was "catchy" and according to them, "could bring them back to the fore". However, "Can Delight" did not prove enough and in 1986, the band broke off after the release of "Can Delight". After the split of My Mine, the group members spent a couple of years composing songs but without being able to produce any of them. In the words of Stefano Micheli: "Then gradually the many hours of work devoted to experimenting with new styles and new sounds began to seem sterile; at least some of us. We parted amicably."

In 2016, original members Carlo Malatesta and Danilo Rosati regrouped My Mine with Ilaria Melis as its vocalist, releasing a new single, "Like a Fool".

Members
 Stefano Micheli - vocals, keyboards, trumpet (1983–1986)
 Carlo Malatesta - vocals, keyboards (1983–1986, 2016–present)
 Danilo Rosati - keyboards, sequencer, drums (1983–1986, 2016–present)
 Darren T. Hatch - vocals, drums (1984–1986)
 Ilaria Melis - vocals (2016–present)

Discography

Albums 
 1985: Stone
 1986: Can Delight (Japan only)

Singles 
 1983: "Hypnotic Tango" - #5 West Germany, #10 Switzerland, #32 Belgium
 1984: "Zorro" - #63 West Germany
 1985: "Cupid Girl"
 1985: "Stone"
 1986: "Can Delight"
 2016: "Like a Fool"
 2018: "Love Is in the Sky"

 "Hypnotic Tango" was the basis of Bananarama's 2005 hit "Look on the Floor (Hypnotic Tango)" which reached No. 26 on the UK Singles Chart

References

External links 
 Stefano Micheli official site
 

Italo disco groups
Musical groups established in 1983
1983 establishments in Italy
Polydor Records artists
Memory Records artists